James K. M. Cheng is a Canadian architect best known for his condominium towers in Vancouver, British Columbia. Cheng's designs, most notably the highrise towers, are noted for their extensive use of glass and for their contribution to the architectural style known as Vancouverism.

Life and work
Cheng was born in Hong Kong and educated at the University of Washington (B.Arch., 1970) and Harvard (M.Arch.) where he studied under Richard Meier. In Canada he then apprenticed under Arthur Erickson. He formed his own firm, James K.M. Cheng Architects Inc.,  in 1978 when he won the commission for the Chinese Cultural Centre in Vancouver. Beginning in the 1990s Vancouver saw an unprecedented real estate boom that led to the construction of dozens of condo towers in the city. Cheng has become the leading residential tower designer of this period. UBC professor Dina Krunic has commented that "concrete construction and green glass façade, for which Vancouver is internationally known, are James Cheng's legacy."  In 2012 Cheng was awarded the Order of Canada.

While most of his projects are residential and in Vancouver, Cheng has other credits:

 Living Shangri-La currently the tallest building in Metro Vancouver
 King George Tower - designed proposed tower that if completed would be one of the tallest buildings in Canada
 Fairmont Pacific Rim- an upscale hotel and condominium building
 Shangri-La Toronto - mixed used hotel, condo tower in Toronto and second building built by Cheng outside BC
 Lincoln Square in Bellevue, Washington and first building built by Cheng outside BC
 Shaw Tower - mix residential-commercial office tower
 Parc Residences in Victoria, BC - residential mid-rise
 Willow Court in Vancouver, BC - residential townhouses - In 1983, Willow Court won Cheng the Governor General's Medal for Architecture 
 The Falls in Victoria, BC - residential mid-rise with retail base
 Terminal City Club Tower - mixed used hotel, condo and office tower
 Waiea Tower in Ward Village - 36-floor residential tower in Honolulu, Hawaii.

References

External links
Official Website
Emporis - James KM Cheng Architects Inc.

Canadian architects
Canadian people of Chinese descent
Glass architecture
Harvard Graduate School of Design alumni
Living people
People from Vancouver
University of Washington College of Built Environments alumni
Skyscraper architects
Hong Kong people
Members of the Order of Canada
Year of birth missing (living people)